The Aces Cup was an ice hockey tournament in France. It was made up mostly of teams from the Ligue Magnus, but in 1986 the top four teams from Nationale 2 also participated. The cup was held three times from 1985-1992, in 1985, 1986, and 1992.

Champions

References

Defunct ice hockey competitions in Europe
Ice hockey competitions in France
Recurring sporting events established in 1985
1985 establishments in France